Penny Black is the fourth studio album by the American rock band Further Seems Forever, released in October 2012 through Rise Records. It marks the reunion of the band's original lineup—singer Chris Carrabba, guitarists Josh Colbert and Nick Dominguez, bassist Chad Neptune, and drummer Steve Kleisath—and is their first album together since 2001's The Moon Is Down. It is also the band's first album since breaking up in 2006 and reuniting in 2010.

Background
Further Seems Forever formed in Pompano Beach, Florida in 1998 and originally consisted of singer Chris Carrabba, guitarists Josh Colbert and Nick Dominguez, bassist Chad Neptune, and drummer Steve Kleisath. By 2000 Carrabba had begun working on his own project, Dashboard Confessional, recording material he considered too personal for Further Seems Forever. At this time the band struggled with interpersonal squabbles and difficulties touring, as Dominguez had a young family and was reluctant to tour outside the state. Carrabba left the band that August to focus on Dashboard Confessional, which went on to mainstream success, but joined them in the studio to record their debut album The Moon Is Down (2001). Dominguez left the band soon after. The remaining members recruited guitarist Derick Cordoba and released two more studio albums with different singers: 2003's How to Start a Fire with Jason Gleason and 2004's Hide Nothing with Jon Bunch. They maintained an amicable relationship with Carrabba, and opened for Dashboard Confessional on several occasions. They played a reunion show with him in 2005, performing The Moon Is Down in its entirety, but broke up in 2006.

The band reunited in 2010, with Carrabba singing and Dominguez on guitar. They began working on a new album in 2011.

Track listing

Personnel
Band
Chris Carrabba – lead vocals, producer, additional engineering
Josh Colbert – guitar
Nick Dominguez – guitar, art direction
Chad Neptune – bass guitar
Steve Kleisath – drums

Production
Mike Fanuele – recording engineer; producer 
Jonathan Michael Clark – recording engineer, mix engineer, producer
Ben Homala – additional engineering
Ryan Alexander – additional engineering
Kris Crummett – mastering

References

Further Seems Forever albums
Rise Records albums
2012 albums